Di is one of the oldest Chinese terms for the earth and a key concept or figure in Chinese philosophy and religion, being one of three powers which are Heaven, Earth, and Humanity, a phrase which originates from the Yijing.

Etymology
Dì is the modern Mandarin Chinese pronunciation. The Old Chinese pronunciation has been reconstructed as *lˤej-s.

The Chinese character  is a phono-semantic compound, combining the  radical ("earth", "dirt") with the (former) sound marker  (Modern Chinese yě, Old Chinese *lajʔ). As , it was one of the characters briefly affected by Wu Zetian's short-lived character reforms.

Taoism
The relationship between Heaven and Earth is important to Taoist cosmology. They are among the "three realms" of the world presided over by the Three Great Emperor-Officials, and thought to maintain the two poles of the "three powers", with humanity occupying the pivotal position between them.

See also
 Agriculture (Chinese mythology)
 Sheji
 Houji

References

External links 
 

Chinese words and phrases